Rebekah "Becky" Dyroen-Lancer (born February 19, 1971 in San Jose, California) is an American competitor in synchronised swimming and Olympic champion.

A member of the Santa Clara Aquamaids Synchronized Swim Team, she participated on the American team that received a gold medal in synchronized swimming at the 1996 Summer Olympics in Atlanta.

Pan American Games
She received a gold medal in solo at the 1991 Pan American Games in Havana.

She received a gold medal in solo, and a second gold medal in duet with Jill Sudduth at the 1995 Pan American Games in Mar del Plata, Argentina.

Awards
Becky Dyroen-Lancer was inducted into the International Swimming Hall of Fame in Fort Lauderdale, Florida in 2004.

Other
Becky worked as the choreographer for the synchronized swimming scene in "Austin Powers The Spy Who Shagged Me". She also worked for Cirque du Soleil from 2000-2005 as a performer in "O". Becky coached various levels of synchronized swimming for many years after her time with Cirque du Soleil, sharing her knowledge with the next generation of synchronized swimmers. In 2015, she changed life paths and moved into education. Becky is currently a teacher in North Central Florida and still coaches in synchronized swimming clinics and camps.

See also
 List of members of the International Swimming Hall of Fame

References

External links

1971 births
Living people
American synchronized swimmers
Synchronized swimmers at the 1996 Summer Olympics
Olympic gold medalists for the United States in synchronized swimming
Swimmers from San Jose, California
Olympic medalists in synchronized swimming
World Aquatics Championships medalists in synchronised swimming
Synchronized swimmers at the 1991 World Aquatics Championships
Medalists at the 1996 Summer Olympics
Pan American Games gold medalists for the United States
Pan American Games medalists in synchronized swimming
Synchronized swimmers at the 1991 Pan American Games
Synchronized swimmers at the 1995 Pan American Games
Medalists at the 1991 Pan American Games
Medalists at the 1995 Pan American Games